Lewis A. Craparotta (born March 7, 1960) is a retired United States Marine Corps lieutenant general who last served as the commanding general of United States Marine Corps Training and Education Command. Craparotta previously served as commanding general of Marine Corps Air Ground Combat Center Twentynine Palms.

Marine career
Craparotta is an alumnus of the University of Vermont, and was commissioned in 1983. He is a 1978 graduate of South Windsor High School, and holds a master's degree in National Security and Strategic Studies from the Naval War College.

Craparotta took command of United States Marine Corps Forces, Pacific on August 8, 2018. Prior to that, he commanded the I Marine Expeditionary Force.

He relinquished command of TECOM to Kevin M. Iiams on August 2, 2021 and held his retirement ceremony immediately after.

Awards and decorations

References

1960 births
Living people
Naval War College alumni
Recipients of the Defense Superior Service Medal
Recipients of the Legion of Merit
United States Marine Corps generals
United States Marine Corps personnel of the Gulf War
United States Marine Corps personnel of the Iraq War
United States Marine Corps personnel of the War in Afghanistan (2001–2021)
University of Vermont alumni